The College of Physicians and Surgeons Pakistan (abbreviated as CPSP) is a regulatory college established in 1962 by a special act of the Parliament of Pakistan to oversee the postgraduate medical education and professional development. It offers certifications following postgraduate training in specialties of medicine, surgery and dentistry. It is the only postgraduate medical examining body in Pakistan.

History
The college was established in 1962 through an act of parliament and by the untiring efforts of 50 eminent physicians in Pakistan under the leadership of Wajid Ali Khan Burki, then Federal Minister of Health. In 1965, the Library of the College of Physicians and Surgeons Pakistan was established and since its inception has acquired latest medical literature and served as a focal point in supporting postgraduate medical education. The Journal of the College of Physicians and Surgeons Pakistan began publication in 1991.

Regional campuses
The regional campuses are located in:
Abbottabad
Bahawalpur
Faisalabad
Hyderabad
Islamabad
Lahore
Larkana
Multan
Muzaffarabad
Nawabshah
Peshawar
Quetta
Rawalpindi
Riyadh, Saudi Arabia
Kathmandu, Nepal

International training centers
Various centers in the United Kingdom
Internal Medicine at King Fahad Medical City, Riyadh, Saudi Arabia
Anaesthesia, Emergency Medicine and Surgery with Medical Council of Ireland
Nepal

International Courses conducted
It is the only institute in Pakistan which conducts official ATLS and ACS courses.

Qualifications award
Fellow of College of Physicians and Surgeons Pakistan (FCPS)
Member of College of Physicians and Surgeons Pakistan (MCPS)

Awards
In 2013, the Europe Business Assembly, which sells "fake awards",, declared the college the "best postgraduate institution of the world[sic]",  and awarded it a prize in the "[b]est [c]ollege" category, at the "Oxford Summit of Leaders 'Science and Education'[sic]".

See also
List of medical organizations in Pakistan
Pakistan Medical Commission

References

External links
CPSP official website
Journal of CPSP
CPSP on HEC digital Library

Pakistan federal departments and agencies
1962 establishments in Pakistan
Government agencies established in 1962
Medical and health organisations based in Pakistan
Professional associations based in Pakistan
Medical regulation in Pakistan
Medical and health regulators
Organizations established in 1962